Rebecca Dubber (born 14 May 1993) is a New Zealand retired para-swimmer. She represented New Zealand at the 2012 Summer Paralympics in London and at the 2016 Summer Paralympics in Rio de Janeiro. At the 2016 Games, she won the bronze medal in the women's 100 m backstroke S7. 

Dubber grew up on the North Shore of Auckland. She was born with sacral agenesis. She was educated at Carmel College, and later the Auckland University of Technology, graduating with a Bachelor of Communication Studies in 2018. 

Dubber started sport as a triathlete. She retired from swimming in March 2019.

References

External links
 
 Meet Our Paralympians: Rebecca Dubber (Attitude Live video profile)

1993 births
Living people
New Zealand female swimmers
Paralympic swimmers of New Zealand
Paralympic bronze medalists for New Zealand
Paralympic medalists in swimming
Swimmers at the 2012 Summer Paralympics
Swimmers at the 2016 Summer Paralympics
Medalists at the 2016 Summer Paralympics
S7-classified Paralympic swimmers
Swimmers from Auckland
Auckland University of Technology alumni
New Zealand female triathletes
People with caudal regression syndrome
People educated at Carmel College, Auckland
Medalists at the World Para Swimming Championships